Chris Mahaffey (born in Atlanta, Georgia) is an American soccer coach.

Mahaffey grew up in Conyers, Georgia, where he was the Georgia State 4A soccer Player of the Year at Heritage High School.  He also played for several youth teams, including the Brookwood Steamers, Stone Mountain Storm, Norcross Fury and AFC Lightning, which won the 2004 State Cup.  In 2003, he spent a single season with the Georgia State University men's soccer team, where he was the Colonial Athletic Association Freshman of the Year.  In 2004, he moved to Germany for a trial with KFC Uerdingen in the third division.  In 2007, he played for the Atlanta Silverbacks U23s of the fourth division Premier Development League.  In 2008, he was called up to the club's senior team, the Atlanta Silverbacks of the USL First Division.

As a coach, Mahaffey has established himself as one of the premier coaches in Georgia Soccer.  In 2011 Mahaffey was recognized as the Georgia Soccer Girls Select Coach of the year.  Mahaffey is known to develop players to play at the highest levels.  He brings with him an impressive youth soccer resume to include coaching in the Region 3 Premier League and National League, winning two State Cup Championships, reaching the Regional Semi Finals twice and winning the Region 3 Premier League Championship.  Mahaffey was the director of coaching at Coweta Soccer Association and formally the assistant coach for Oglethorpe University Women's Soccer, where he helped lead the team to its best season in school history.  Mahaffey is currently the executive director for Henry County Soccer Association.

In 2016 Mahaffey was hired as the assistant head coach of the Georgia Revolution FC of the National Premier Soccer League.  Entering into the 2017 season, he was promoted to the team's head coach.

References

External links
 Georgia Revolution FC
 Atlanta Silverbacks Player Profile

Living people
Atlanta Silverbacks players
Atlanta Silverbacks U23's players
American expatriate soccer players
KFC Uerdingen 05 players
USL League Two players
USL First Division players
Soccer players from Georgia (U.S. state)
American soccer players
Association football midfielders
Year of birth missing (living people)